Howard Wallace Crossett (July 22, 1918 – June 30, 1968) was an American bobsledder who competed in the early 1950s. He won a silver medal in the four-man event at the 1952 Winter Olympics in Oslo.

References
Bobsleigh four-man Olympic medalists for 1924, 1932-56, and since 1964
Howard Crossett's profile at databaseOlympics
Howard Crossett's profile at Sports Reference.com

1918 births
1968 deaths
American male bobsledders
Bobsledders at the 1952 Winter Olympics
Medalists at the 1952 Winter Olympics
Olympic silver medalists for the United States in bobsleigh